Siliako Lauhea is a Wallisian politician and former member of the Territorial Assembly of Wallis and Futuna. He was President of the Territorial Assembly from December 2010 to November/December 2011.

He was elected President of the Territorial Assembly on 7 December 2010, succeeding Victor Brial. He lost his seat at the 2012 election.

After leaving politics he became president of the Association of Pensioners of Wallis and Futuna.

References

Living people
Wallis and Futuna politicians
Presidents of the Territorial Assembly of Wallis and Futuna
Year of birth missing (living people)